Kate McCue (born January 6, 1978) is an American cruise ship captain. She is currently employed by Celebrity Cruises and is the captain of the Celebrity Beyond.  

When she became the commanding officer of Celebrity Summit in 2015, it was the first time that an American woman had been named captain of a "Mega" cruise ship. Prior to her time at Celebrity, she had worked as an officer for both Disney Cruise Lines and Royal Caribbean.

Early life
McCue moved around with her family during her childhood due to her father's employment as an engineer. Originally from San Francisco, she spent time in Evans, Georgia, where she attended Lakeside High School, and was resident for a period in Michigan. After travelling with her family on a cruise ship to the Bahamas when she was 12, she sought to become a cruise director. Her family then moved back to San Francisco.

Maritime career
She began attending the California State University Maritime Academy, then California Maritime Academy, in 1996. McCue graduated with a Bachelor's degree in business administration in 1999, and also studied celestial navigation during sailing trips in the summer breaks. While undertaking her degree, she undertook an internship for Chiquita Brands International working on one of their cargo ships, transporting bananas from Ecuador to Long Beach, California. After graduation, she moved to Maui in the Hawaiian Islands where she stayed with her cousins for six months, working as a general deck hand on a catamaran undertaking tourist cruises to the Molokini crater. McCue then became a logistics manager to Maersk Sealand in Los Angeles, but wanted to return to sea.

After applying to cruise lines for nine months, she gained a job with Disney Cruise Line in an entry-level position as a third mate. In 2003, she became a second officer for Royal Caribbean. While her role on Disney saw her travel around the Caribbean, her new posting saw her travel all over the world. After a year, she was promoted to first officer. She attended the Maritime Institute of Technology and Graduate Studies in Baltimore in 2009 where she earned her Chief Mate and Master's Licence to enable her to take command of a vessel. When she returned to Royal Caribbean, she was promoted first to chief officer (the senior first officer) and then to staff captain (the second in command) in 2011.

The president of Celebrity Cruises, Lisa Lutoff-Perlo, contacted McCue in 2015 and asked her to apply for a role of captain with them. Celebrity Cruises is owned by the Royal Caribbean Cruises LTD. McCue duly applied and was appointed as the commanding officer of Celebrity Summit on September 13, 2015, making her the first American woman to command a modern "mega ship". Lutoff-Perlo later said that "Kate was the first opportunity to make significant change at Celebrity related to gender equality." In 2018, she left the Summit to become the commanding officer on Celebrity Equinox and subsequently moved to the Celebrity Edge in 2019. On October 14, 2021 Celebrity Cruises announced that McCue will take the helm of Celebrity Beyond, their newest ship debuting spring 2022.

McCue follows in the footsteps of other female cruise ship captains, with the Swedish captain Karin Stahre-Janson placed in command of a Royal Caribbean vessel in 2007. Other women such as Inger Klein Thorhauge for Cunard Line (2010), Sarah Breton for P&O Cruises (2010), Lis Lauritzen for Royal Caribbean, and Margrith Ettlin for Silversea Cruises (2013) each preceded McCue.

Her sphynx cat, Bug Naked, sails with her aboard and has attracted media attention.

References

1970s births
Living people
People from San Francisco
Sea captains
American sailors
Female sailors
California State University Maritime Academy alumni